The forest wood hoopoe (Phoeniculus castaneiceps) is a species of bird in the family Phoeniculidae.  It is found in Cameroon, Central African Republic, Republic of the Congo, Democratic Republic of the Congo, Ivory Coast, Ghana, Guinea, Liberia, Nigeria, Rwanda, and Uganda.

References

forest wood hoopoe
Birds of the African tropical rainforest
forest wood hoopoe
Taxonomy articles created by Polbot
Taxobox binomials not recognized by IUCN